Si Kak Phraya Si is an intersection in area of Wang Burapha Phirom sub-district, Phra Nakhon district, Bangkok. It is the intersection of Charoen Krung,  Fueang Nakhon and Ban Mo roads. It is considered to be the second intersection of Charoen Krung, the first official street in Thailand, after nearby Saphan Mon (Mon bridge).

The term Si Kak Phraya Si can mean Phraya Si's intersection and comes from the Teochew word "角" (Kak) meaning angle or corner and  "四" (Si) meaning four, which refers the four-way intersection. Also, Phraya Si (พระยาศรี) is the name of Mon who has a house in this neighbourhood. He was an aristocrat during the reign of King Mongkut (Rama IV) and the leader in the construction of Charoen Krung including Saphan Mon. In addition, there is also Soi Phraya Si (Phraya Si alley), another way named in his honour. It is an alley that connects Fueang Nakhon and Atsadang roads to the Saphan Hok (Lifting bridge) over Khlong Lot (คลองหลอด; lit: tube canal). At this area, is the site of the first department store in Thailand – Harry A. Badman and Co., by Mr. Badman, British businessman in 1899 during the reign of King Chulalongkorn (Rama V).

So the name "Si Kak Phraya Si" is so named after the Chinese who were dragging the rickshaw through here during the reign of King Mongkut and still used as the official name until now. To this day, there're only two intersections with the prefixed "Si Kak" that are here and Si Kak Sao Chingcha (สี่กั๊กเสาชิงช้า) near Sam Phraeng area.

Besides, Si Kak Phraya Si was the site of the first café in Thailand named "Red Cross Tea Room" by Madam Cole (Edna S. Cole), an American woman who was founder of Kullasatri Wanglang School (Wattana Wittaya Academy). The café opened in 1917 during the First World War to raise money for the Red Cross to help the Allies. The location is also home to many luxury restaurants for foreigners and the elite of Thai society, in the period before the revolution in 1932, alike another areas in Bangkok, such as Ratchawong in Bangkok's Chinatown, Silom, Surawong or Si Phraya in Bangrak.

References 

Road junctions in Bangkok
Phra Nakhon district
Streets in Bangkok
Neighbourhoods of Bangkok